Pir Kandi (also Romanized as Pīr Kandī) is a village in Ivughli Rural District, Ivughli District, Khoy County, West Azerbaijan Province, Iran. At the 2006 census, its population was 1,302, in 373 families.

References 

Populated places in Khoy County